Nature's Half Acre is a 1951 American short documentary film directed by James Algar. In 1952, it won an Oscar at the 24th Academy Awards for Best Short Subject (Two-Reel). The film was produced by Walt Disney as part of the True-Life Adventures series of nature documentaries, and was paired with Alice in Wonderland during its original theatrical run.

Plot

Cast
 Winston Hibler as Narrator

References

External links

1951 films
1951 documentary films
1951 short films
1950s short documentary films
American short documentary films
Disney documentary films
Documentary films about nature
1950s English-language films
Disney short films
Films produced by Walt Disney
Films scored by Paul Smith (film and television composer)
Live Action Short Film Academy Award winners
Short films directed by James Algar
RKO Pictures short films
Films with screenplays by Winston Hibler
1950s American films